The following is a list of radio stations in Port Harcourt, Nigeria.

See also

Music of Port Harcourt
Media of Nigeria

References

External links

Radio stations
 
Port Harcourt